Jitterbugs is a 1943 Laurel and Hardy feature film produced by Sol M. Wurtzel and directed by Mal St.Clair.

Plot
Stan and Ollie are musicians travelling across the country as "The Original Zoot Suit Band". En route to their next gig, their car runs out of gas and they are rescued by Chester Wright, an inventor who has perfected a pill which will turn water into gas (in reality he is a small-time con man who simply switches a water canister with a canister of gas when the duo aren't looking).

The trio make a plan to travel to the next town "Midvale" and after using Stan and Ollie's music to attract a crowd Chester takes the opportunity to sell his "miracle pill" to the masses and make a fortune. As Stan and Ollie play, Chester makes the acquaintance of a young choir singer named Susan. The trio's sales pitch is initially a success but their scam is soon uncovered when a customer returns after having poured the "gasoline" into the fuel tank of his car and ended up in a nasty accident. Chester prevents the angry mob from attacking Stan and Ollie by posing as a police officer arriving on the scene to arrest Stan and Ollie. Susan jumps on the back of the trio's trailer after realizing Chester still has her purse that she asked him to hold. As Susan and Chester get to know each other, Susan tells Chester that her mother was recently conned out of a large amount of money by a gang who want to use the money to bet on a big horse race. Chester has a hunch that he may know the gang and with the aid of Stan and Ollie agrees to help Susan get her mother's money back.

The group returns to the town and posing as out-of-town businessmen, check into the same hotel where Henry Corcoran, the leader of the con men, is staying. In plain view of Corcoran, Ollie (going under the name "Colonel Watterson Bixby") pretends to deposit $20,000 in the hotel safe to make the gang think that Ollie is incredibly wealthy. Corcoran instructs his girlfriend Dorcas to seduce "Colonel Watterson Bixby" in her hotel room, but she accidentally ends up inviting Stan instead. When Ollie enters the hotel room, a drunken Stan thinking that it is Corcoran hides under the couch and becomes increasingly more intoxicated while he is hiding. Corcoran finally enters the room and Ollie pretends to be an undercover police officer sent to arrest Corcoran for swindling Susan's mother out of her money. Thinking he is about to be sent to jail, Corcoran agrees to give the stolen money back but reveals he only has half of the $10,000 and his partner, a man named Bennett, has the other half. Corcoran attempts to shoot Ollie and Chester but is pulled to the ground by Stan and thrown in the closet by Ollie and Chester.

The group then begin their next plan to get the other half of the money by having Susan get a job as a singer at the club on board a boat run by Bennett. They then have Stan dress as a woman and pose as Susan's rich aunt and convince Bennett to invest in a show at his club which they say will make him a fortune and will only require a combined $10,000 investment from him and Susan's aunt, which agrees to. The two agree to place $5000 apiece in an envelope and place it in a safe.

Bennett goes to a colleague of his, Tony Queen in order to loan the $5000 to put into the show, as he plans on stealing the envelope and keeping the $10,000 for himself. Unbeknownst to Bennett, the group plan to switch the envelopes and escape with Bennett's $5000. Stan and Ollie successfully switch Bennett's $5000 and give it to Chester to put in the hotel safe. However, when the gang realize they have been conned, they capture Stan, Ollie and Susan. They search the hotel for Chester but he is nowhere to be found, giving Stan, Ollie and Susan the impression that he was only using them to get the money for himself.

The trio are taken to Bennett's club where Susan is forced back into work as a singer and dancer, and Stan and Ollie are put to work in the engine room. They manage to escape after one of the guards takes one of Chester's gas pills thinking it is for indigestion and floats to the ceiling. Stan and Ollie rescue Susan but the guard accidentally lands on the controls of the ship which send it speeding out to sea, nearly hitting several other ships.

The police arrive with Chester to arrest the gang. Susan scolds Chester for running off with the money but Chester clarifies that he left the hotel to wire the money to her mother immediately, showing her a receipt as proof. Stan and Ollie arrive on deck to see Susan and Chester kiss before leaving the ship. The duo plan to leave the ship as well but suddenly the remaining gangsters come around the corner and Stan and Ollie leap overboard in order to escape.

Analysis
The film is notable for its dance sequences and the interaction between the duo with Vivian Blaine and Lee Patrick. Blaine, who later starred in the Broadway production of Guys and Dolls, was among those who honored Laurel and Hardy during their December 1954 appearance on NBC's This Is Your Life.

The film was a reworking of Arizona to Broadway, made ten years earlier by the Fox Film Corporation.

Jitterbugs is often considered to be the best Laurel and Hardy film made under 20th Century Fox.

Cast

References

External links 

 
 
 

1943 films
Laurel and Hardy (film series)
American black-and-white films
Films directed by Malcolm St. Clair
1943 comedy films
Films scored by Leigh Harline
20th Century Fox films
1940s English-language films
1940s American films

fi:Jitterbug